This is a list of musicians who have made notable use of Mesa/Boogie amplifiers in live performances or studio recordings.

Mesa/Boogie users

 Blink 182
 Buckethead
 Lindsey Buckingham of Fleetwood Mac
 Les Claypool of Primus
 Kurt Cobain of Nirvana
 Chris Cornell of Soundgarden
 Mike Derks of Gwar
 Al Di Meola
 Jerry Garcia of the Grateful Dead
 Dave Grohl of Foo Fighters
 Kirk Hammett of Metallica
 James Hetfield of Metallica
 Adam Jones of Tool
 Mick Jones of the Clash
 Lamb of God
 Alex Lifeson of Rush
 Johnny Marr of The Smiths
 Mick Mars of Mötley Crüe
 Paul McCartney
 Munky of Korn
 Gary Numan
 Ed O'Brien of Radiohead
 The Offspring
 John Petrucci of Dream Theater
 Prince
 Keith Richards of The Rolling Stones
 Todd Rundgren
 Carlos Santana of Santana
 John Sykes
 Kim Thayil of Soundgarden
 Mark Tremonti of Creed
 Brian Welch of Korn
 Ronnie Wood of The Rolling Stones
 Frank Zappa

References

Lists of musicians
Lists of musicians by instrument
Mesa/Boogie